Drissa Diarra (born 7 July 1985 in Bamako) is a Malian football player. He currently plays as a midfielder for FC Otranto in Italy.

He played for the Mali national football team at the 2001 FIFA U-17 World Championship and the 2003 FIFA World Youth Championship.

Career
In 2017, Diarra joined the Italian club F.C. Otranto.

Club statistics

Updated to games played as of 20 April 2014.

References

External links

AC Bellinzona profile
http://www.football.ch/sfl/821119/de/Kader.aspx?tId=0&pId=791682

1985 births
Living people
Sportspeople from Bamako
Malian footballers
Association football defenders
U.S. Lecce players
A.C. Perugia Calcio players
S.S.D. Lucchese 1905 players
AC Bellinzona players
Budapest Honvéd FC players
FC Chiasso players
Serie A players
Serie B players
Serie D players
Swiss Super League players
Nemzeti Bajnokság I players
Malian expatriate footballers
Expatriate footballers in Italy
Expatriate footballers in Switzerland
Expatriate footballers in Hungary
Malian expatriate sportspeople in Italy
Malian expatriate sportspeople in Switzerland
Malian expatriate sportspeople in Hungary
Mali under-20 international footballers
21st-century Malian people